Elsa Silber (also Ella Silber) was an Estonian silent film actress.

Filmography

 1924 "Mineviku varjud" (role: ?)
 1925 "Tšeka komissar Miroštšenko" (role: ?)
 1927 "Kevade unelm" (role: Hilma Aamisep, upstarter's daughter)
 1929 "Jüri Rumm" (role: Jüri Rumm's daughter)

References

Year of birth missing
Place of birth missing
Year of death missing
Place of death missing
Estonian film actresses
Estonian silent film actresses
20th-century Estonian actresses